Wingen may refer to:

 Wingen, New South Wales in Australia
 Wingen, Bas-Rhin, in the arrondissement of Wissembourg in the communes of the Bas-Rhin department in France
 Wingen-sur-Moder, a commune in the Bas-Rhin department in Alsace